Plaesiorrhina mhondana is a beetle belonging to the family Scarabaeidae.

Subordinated taxa
 Plaesiorrhina mhondana var. flavipennis Kolbe, 1892 
 Plaesiorrhina mhondana var. scalaris Quedenfeldt, 1891 
 Plaesiorrhina mhondana var. triplagiata Kolbe, 1892 
 Plaesiorrhina mhondana var. vacua Gerstäcker, 1884

Description
The basic colour is dark brown, with an orange markings on the elytra.

Distribution
This species can be found in Kenya and Tanzania.

References

mhondana
Beetles described in 1880